Bermuda is an unincorporated community in Conecuh County, Alabama, United States.

History
The community is likely named after Bermudagrass, which was tested in the area. The U.S. Department of Agriculture, Weather Bureau, Alabama Section, operated a weather station in Bermuda. Jeremiah Austill, who participated in the Canoe Fight during the Creek War, lived near the present site of Bermuda. Bermuda is located along the route of the Federal Road.

References

Unincorporated communities in Conecuh County, Alabama
Unincorporated communities in Alabama